Angianthus is a genus of flowering plants in the family Asteraceae, which was first described by Wendland in 1810. The type species is Angianthus tomentosus.

Etymology
The genus name derives from the Greek: angeion, a vessel or cup, and anthos, flower, and "allud(es) to the cup-like shape of the ring of broad pappus-scales in A. tomentosus."

Species
All species of this genus are endemic to Australia.

Gallery

References

External links
 Australian Virtual Herbarium: Occurrence data for Angianthus
 GBIF: Occurrence data for Angianthus
 South Australia seedbank website: Angianthus
 SA Flora: Angianthus
 

Gnaphalieae
Asteraceae genera
Endemic flora of Australia
Taxa named by Johann Christoph Wendland
Plants described in 1810